The New Delhi-Kalka Shatabdi Express is a superfast express fully airconditioned train connecting New Delhi and Kalka. It is one of the superfast trains in the New Delhi - Kalka section covering a distance of 303 km in a span of 4 hours 5 min. The train runs at an average speed of 95 km per hour (including halts).

Coach composition
The train comprises 10 AC Chair Cars, 2 AC First Class coach & 2 End-On-Generation Cars.

It is a superfast fully electric hauled train in India, with a top speed of 140 kilometers per hour. The train is hauled by a matching WAP 7 of Ghaziabad electric locomotive shed.

Schedule 
The schedule of this 12006/12005 New Delhi - Kalka Express is given below:-

See also 
 Indian Railways
 Kalka Shatabdi Express

References

Shatabdi Express trains
Rail transport in Haryana
Rail transport in Delhi
Rail transport in Chandigarh
Transport in Delhi